Irréversible (Original Soundtrack From The Motion Picture) is the soundtrack album to the film of the same name, as well as a solo album by Thomas Bangalter. The album was produced by Bangalter, who is best known for being one-half of the French house duo Daft Punk. The tracks "Outrun" and "Extra Dry" were featured on the Midnight Club II soundtrack. North American pressings of the soundtrack are marketed as a Bangalter solo album and omit the Mahler, Daho and Beethoven selections. "Outrun" and "Ventura" were previously released on Bangalter's Trax on da Rocks EP while "Extra Dry" had appeared in Trax on da Rocks Vol. 2, and "Spinal Scratch" had been a non-album single.

Track listings

North American version

References

External links

Thriller film soundtracks
Thomas Bangalter albums
2002 soundtrack albums
Albums produced by Thomas Bangalter